Lilin were hostile night spirits that attacked men in ancient Mesopotamian religion and Jewish folklore.

Judaism 
In Jewish mythology, Lilin is a term for night spirits.

Biblical apocrypha 
In the Syriac Apocalypse of Baruch, lilin come from the desert and they are similar to shedim.

See also
 Lilu (mythology), Akkadian and Sumerian demons
 Lilith, Jewish female demon
 Nocnitsa

Notes

References

Mesopotamian legendary creatures
Demons in Judaism